
Hougham is a village and civil parish in the South Kesteven district of Lincolnshire, England,  north from Grantham. The village of Marston, Lincolnshire is its closest neighbour, just under  to the south.

History
A fair and market were both founded in 1330.

The village once had its own railway station on the line between Grantham and Newark.

Community
Hougham church is dedicated to All Saints. It is built in Norman style, and contains a monument to Sir Hugh de Bussey, said to have been senior among the Knights Templar.

The ecclesiastical parish is also Hougham, part of The Barkston and Hough Group of the Loveden Deanery of the Diocese of Lincoln. As of 2014, the incumbent is Revd Alan Littlewood.

The Manor House was built c.1620, on the site of a 13th-century manor of the De Bussey family. It has been extensively altered up to the 20th century.  The original moat is still discernible.

References

External links
 
 Hougham Village website
 "Hougham and Marston: Hougham Manor", Roffe.co.uk

Villages in Lincolnshire
Civil parishes in Lincolnshire
South Kesteven District